The following science-fiction TV shows and radio programs have been produced exclusively or mostly in Canada. (Science-fiction related genres include Fantasy, Horror, and Supernatural.) Many of these programs have been run and/or produced by American or other international production companies. (See Canadian science fiction for more information.)  Series in bold have the in-universe story take place in Canada or have Canadian characters in them.

Live action science fiction television drama series

1950s debut
Space Command (1953)
The Man from Tomorrow (1958)

1970s debut
The Hilarious House of Frightenstein (1971)
The Starlost (1973)
Peep Show (1975)
Read All About It! (1979)

1980s debut
The Hitchhiker (1983)
Friday the 13th: The Series (1985)
The New Alfred Hitchcock Presents (1985)
The Ray Bradbury Theater (1985)
Airwolf (1987)
Captain Power (1987)
Earth Star Voyager (1988)
My Secret Identity (1988)
War of the Worlds (1988)

1990s debut
Counterstrike (1990)
Maniac Mansion (1990)
Beyond Reality (1991)
The Hidden Room (1991)
Forever Knight (1992)
Highlander: The Series (1992)
Nightmare Cafe (1992)
The Odyssey (1992)
Matrix (1993)
The X-Files (1993) first five seasons filmed in Vancouver, later seasons in Los Angeles
M.A.N.T.I.S. (1994)
Robocop: The Series (1994)
TekWar (1994)
Viper (1994)
Deepwater Black (1995)
Mysterious Island (1995)
The Outer Limits (1995)
Sliders (1995) first two seasons filmed in Vancouver, later seasons in Los Angeles
Strange Luck (1995)
VR.5 (1995)
Poltergeist: The Legacy (1996)
The Pretender (1996)
Profit (1996)
Psi Factor: Chronicles of the Paranormal (1996)
The Sentinel (1996)
Space Cases (1996)
Cloned (1997)
Doomsday Rock (1997)
Earth: Final Conflict (1997)
Honey, I Shrunk the Kids: The TV Show (1997)
Lexx (1997)
Night Man (1997)
Ninja Turtles: The Next Mutation  (1997)
Sleepwalkers (1997)
Stargate SG-1 (1997)
Animorphs (1998)
Eerie, Indiana: The Other Dimension (1998)
First Wave (1998)
Highlander: The Raven (1998)
Mercy Point (1998)
Seven Days (1998) 1st season in California, later season in Vancouver
Welcome to Paradox (1998)
BeastMaster (1999)
Big Wolf on Campus (1999)
Code Name: Eternity (1999)
Harsh Realm (1999)
Relic Hunter (1999)
Strange World (1999)
Sir Arthur Conan Doyle's The Lost World (1999)
So Weird (1999)
Total Recall 2070 (1999)

2000s debut
Andromeda (2000)
Dark Angel (2000)
Freedom (2000)
The Immortal (2000)
Level 9 (2000)
Mysterious Ways (2000)
The Others (2000) Pilot filmed in Vancouver, the rest of the season's in California.
The Secret Adventures of Jules Verne (2000)
Sole Survivor (2000)
The Zack Files (2000)
The Chronicle (2001)
The Lone Gunmen (2001)
Mutant X (2001)
MythQuest (2001)
Night Visions (2001)
Smallville (2001)
Special Unit 2 (2001)
Starhunter (2001)
Tracker (2001)
Vampire High (2001)
Wolf Lake (2001)
2030 CE (2002)
The Dead Zone (2002) For the sixth season, production moved to Montreal.
Galidor: Defenders of the Outer Dimension (2002)
Haunted  (2002)
Jeremiah (2002)
John Doe (2002)
Odyssey 5 (2002)
Strange Days at Blake Holsey High (2002)
Taken (2002)
Alienated (2003)
Jake 2.0 (2003)
Miracles (2003)
The Twilight Zone (2003)
The 4400 (2004)
Battlestar Galactica (2004)
The Collector (2004)
Kingdom Hospital (2004)
ReGenesis (2004)
Stargate Atlantis (2004)
Charlie Jade (2005)
Tru Calling (2005)
Blade: The Series (2006)
EUReKA (2006)
Kyle XY (2006)
Masters of Science Fiction (2006)
Three Moons Over Milford (2006)
A.M.P.E.D (2007)
Bionic Woman (2007)
Blood Ties (2007)
Dinosapien (2007)
Flash Gordon (2007)
Grand Star (2007)
Painkiller Jane (2007)
Reaper (2007)
Unnatural History (2007)
The Andromeda Strain (2008)
Caprica (2008)
Fear Itself (2008)
Fringe (2008) Pilot filmed in Toronto, 1st season in New York City, later seasons in Vancouver
Sanctuary (2008)
Aaron Stone (2009)
Being Erica (2009)
Defying Gravity (2009)
Harper's Island (2009)
The Listener (2009)
Stargate Universe (2009)
Storm World (2009)
The Troop (2009)
Warehouse 13 (2009)

2010s debut
Haven (2010)
Les Rescapés (2010)
Lost Girl (2010)
R.L. Stine's The Haunting Hour (2010)
Tower Prep (2010)
Alcatraz (2012)
Arrow (2012)
Continuum (2012)
Primeval New World (2012)
Defiance (2013)
Orphan Black (2013)
The Tomorrow People (2013)
The 100 (2014)
Ascension (2014)
The Flash (2014)
Helix (2014)
12 Monkeys (2015)
Between (2015)
Dark Matter (2015)
The Expanse (2015)
Killjoys (2015)
Minority Report (2015)
Olympus (2015)
Travelers (2016)
Van Helsing  (2016)
Wynonna Earp  (2016)

2020s debut
Utopia Falls (2020)

Documentaries/Newsmagazine shows
The Nature of Things (1960)
Science Magazine (1975)
Science International (1976)
Prisoners of Gravity (1989)
The Anti Gravity Room (1996)
2001: A Space Road Odyssey (2001)
HypaSpace (2002)
Proof Positive (2004)
Beyond, The Series (2005)
Shadow Hunter (2005)

French-language shows
Lunatiques (1999)
Dans une galaxie près de chez vous (1998)

Animation
The Marvel Superheroes (1966)
Rocket Robin Hood (1966)
Spider-Man (1967)
Inspector Gadget (1983)
ReBoot (1993)
Tales From the Cryptkeeper (1993)
Beast Wars (1996)
Robocop: Alpha Commando (1998)
Shadow Raiders (1998)
Beast Machines (1999)
Action Man (2000)
Heavy Gear (2001)
Xcalibur (2001)
Spider-Man: The New Animated Series (2003)
Atomic Betty (2004)
Dark Oracle (2004)
Delta State (2004)
Dragon Booster (2004)
Tripping the Rift (2004)
Zeroman (2004)
Zixx (2004)
Get Ed (2005)
Station X (2005)
Di-Gata Defenders (2006)
Spider Riders (2006)
Storm Hawks (2007)
Escape from Planet Earth (2009)
Max Steel (2013)

Radio
Nazi Eyes on Canada (1942) CBC radio series 
Johnny Chase: Secret Agent of Space (1978) CBC radio series 
Nightfall (1980) CBC radio series 
Vanishing Point (1984) CBC radio series 
Soundings (1985) radio drama produced by Jeff Green, originally aired on CHEZ 106 and later CBC
Faster Than Light (2002) CBC radio pilot (broadcast Sept 22nd, 2002 on Sunday Showcase (in mono) and again Sept 23rd on Monday Night Playhouse (in stereo). 
Canadia: 2056 (2007) CBC radio series

Telefilms
The Incredible Hulk Returns (1988)
Bionic Showdown: The Six Million Dollar Man and the Bionic Woman (1989)
The Trial of the Incredible Hulk (1989)
The Death of the Incredible Hulk (1990)
It (1990)
TekWar: TekJustice (1994)
TekWar: TekLab (1994)
TekWar: TekLords (1994)
Tekwar: The Movie (1994)
Generation X (1996)
Trilogy of Terror II (1996)
Nick Fury: Agent of S.H.I.E.L.D. (1998)
Atomic Train (1999)
Ginger Snaps (2000)
RoboCop: Prime Directives (2000)
The Pretender 2001 (2001)
The Pretender: Island of the Haunted  (2001)
Babylon 5: The Legend of the Rangers (2002)
Carrie (2002)
Kaput and Zösky: The Ultimate Obliterators (2002)
Saint Sinner (2002)
A Wrinkle in Time (2003)
Hot Wheels Highway 35 World Race (2003)
5ive Days to Midnight (2004)
Decoys (2004)
Earthsea (2004)
Ginger Snaps: Unleashed (2004)
Ginger Snaps Back: The Beginning (2004)
Meltdown (2004) (2004)
Snakehead Terror (2004)
Acceleracers: Speed of Silence (2005)
Deadly Skies (2005)
The Last Templar (2005)
Painkiller Jane (2005)
Rapid Fire (2005)
AcceleRacers: Breaking Point (2006)
AcceleRacers: The Ultimate Race (2006)
Earthstorm (2006)
Savage Planet (2006)
Fire Serpent (2007)
KAW (2007)
Tin Man (2007)
Swamp Devil (2008)
The Phantom  (2009)
Virtuality (2009)
Paradox (2010)

Web series
Sanctuary (2007)

See also
 Canadian science fiction